Callambulyx poecilus is a species of moth of the family Sphingidae. It is found along the southern slopes of the Himalaya, from northern Pakistan, through Nepal and north-eastern India to southern China (Yunnan and Hainan Island), and south into northern Thailand and Vietnam. It is also known from northern Sumatra.

The wingspan is about 77 mm. The forewing underside is red in the basal half.

References

Callambulyx
Moths described in 1898